National Highway 138 is a national highway of India.

Route 
This highway connects Palayamkottai in Tirunelveli city to V. O. Chidambaranar Port Trust in Thoothukudi city. This route provides quick transportation of goods from Tirunelveli to V. O. Chidambaranar Port Trust in Thoothukudi. It provides a direct route to the port and is 54 km in length.

Tuticorin Airport in also situated on this highway near Vagaikulam. The airport is situated 26 km from Thoothukudi city and 28 km from Tirunelveli city.

References

External links
 NH 138 on OpenStreetMap

National highways in India
National Highways in Tamil Nadu